Alexandru Marian Musi (born 17 July 2004) is a Romanian professional footballer who plays as a forward for Romanian club Politehnica Iași, on loan from FCSB.

Club career

FCSB
Alexandru Musi started his career at FCSB. He made his debut on 19 May 2021 when he played from the start in a 0-1 lose against Universitatea Craiova, being replaced at halftime with Alexandru Buziuc.

Loan to Politehnica Iași
In December 2022, Politehnica Iași announced the signing of Musi on loan.

Career Statistics

Club

References

External links
 
 

2004 births
Living people
Footballers from Bucharest
Romanian emigrants to Spain
Romanian footballers
Romania youth international footballers
Association football forwards
Liga I players
Liga II players
FC Steaua București players
FC Politehnica Iași (2010) players